Anne R. Kaiser (born February 10, 1968) is an American politician from the state of Maryland who serves in the Maryland House of Delegates, where she represents the 14th district, which includes parts of Silver Spring, Calverton, Colesville, Cloverly, Fairland, Burtonsville, Spencerville, Olney, Brookeville, Ashton-Sandy Spring, Brinklow, Laytonsville, Sunshine, Goshen, and Damascus in Montgomery County.

Background 
Kaiser was born in Washington, D.C., on February 10, 1968, and grew up in Rockville, Maryland. She graduated from Rockville High School and then attended the University of Chicago, graduating with a B.A. in political science in 1990. She received two master's degrees from the University of Michigan in 1995, a master's in public policy and a master's in educational studies.

Career and community involvement 
Between college and graduate school, Kaiser worked for Congressman Neal Smith (D-Iowa) as well as for Maryland Delegate Hank Heller. During that time, Kaiser became active in Montgomery County Democratic politics, was a member of the Giant Food Consumer Advisory Board, and coached youth basketball.

After completing graduate school, Kaiser worked as an economist at the IRS from December 1995 until April 2002. During that time she was a member of the Wheaton Urban District Advisory Committee, the Rockville Branch of the American Association of University Women (serving as membership VP and secretary), and continued coaching youth basketball. She served in leadership positions as chair of the Mid-County Citizens' Advisory Board and co-coordinator of the Montgomery County Women's Fair. In 1998, she was elected to a 4-year term on the Montgomery County Democratic Central Committee.

Kaiser is an adjunct professor at the University of Maryland, College Park, teaching a course on Women in Leadership and a course on Public Leaders and Active Citizens. She was previously an adjunct professor at Montgomery College teaching an Introduction to Political Science course. In 2016, she was a facilitator/teacher for the Mount Vernon Leadership Fellows program.

Kaiser is a lifetime member of Tikvat Israel (formerly Beth Tikva) Congregation in Rockville.

House of Delegates 
Kaiser was first elected to the Maryland House of Delegates in 2002, and was reelected in 2006, 2010, 2014 and 2018. As of the 2022 session, Kaiser is a member of the Health and Government Operations Committee. Additionally, she serves on the Rules Committee and the Spending Affordability Committee.

Kaiser previously served for five years as the Chairman of the powerful Ways and Means Committee, for two years as Majority Leader and was Vice-Chair of the House Democratic Caucus during the 2014 election. Her previous service also includes time as the elected chair of the 24 member Montgomery County House Delegation, the largest in the state of Maryland.

During the 2004 legislative session, Kaiser testified on behalf of H.B. 1284: Medical Decision-Making Act and in her testimony announced that she is a lesbian. In making this announcement, she joined openly gay Maryland legislators Delegate Maggie L. McIntosh and then-Delegate Rich Madaleno (later a senator and now a county's budget director).

In 2004, she was elected as a Kerry delegate to the Democratic National Convention. In 2020, Kaiser was elated to be selected as a Biden delegate to the Democratic National Convention.

Personal 
On February 23, 2013, Kaiser became engaged to her long-time partner, Nancy C. Lineman. On November 2, 2013, they got married and now live in the Calverton neighborhood of Silver Spring. They announced the birth of their daughter Allison Joan "AJ" Lineman in May 2019.

Awards 
Kaiser has been recognized with several awards:
 Out for Equality award, Equality Maryland
 Nominated for the Young Woman of Achievement Award, Women's Information Network (2003)
 One of MD's Top 100 Women, The Daily Record (2006)
 Legislator of the Year, MD Nurses Association (2007)
 Advocacy in Action Award, MD Association of Youth Services Bureaus (2008)
 Legislator of the Year, MC Region of the MD Association of Student Councils (2011)
 Olney Theatre, Public Service Award (2014)
 Legislator of the Year, MD School Counselors Association (2015)
 Seven certificates of appreciation, MD Municipal League (2006, 2007, 2017-2021)
 Public School Champion Award, Strong Schools Maryland (2021)

Election results 
2018 race for the Maryland House of Delegates – 14th district
UNOFFICIAL RESULTS
Voters to choose three:
{| class="wikitable"
|-
!Name
!Votes
!Percent
!Outcome
|-
|- 
|Anne Kaiser, Democratic
|37,733
|  24.5%
|   Won
|-
|- 
|Pamela Queen, Democratic
|35,991
|  23.4%
|   Won
|-
|- 
|Eric Luedtke, Democratic
|35,104
|  22.8%
|   Won
|-
|- 
|Patricia Fenati, Republican
|15,895
|  10.3%
|   Lost
|-
|- 
|Kevin Dorrance, Republican
|14,546
|  9.5%
|   Lost
|-
|- 
|Michael Ostroff, Republican
|14,347
|  9.3%
|   Lost
|}

2014 race for the Maryland House of Delegates – 14th district
Voters to choose three:
{| class="wikitable"
|-
!Name
!Votes
!Percent
!Outcome
|-
|- 
|Anne Kaiser, Democratic
|21,988
|  20.2%
|   Won
|-
|- 
|Craig Zucker, Democratic
|20,917
|  19.3%
|   Won
|-
|- 
|Eric Luedtke, Democratic
|20,012
|  18.4%
|   Won
|-
|- 
|Patricia Fenati, Republican
|15,392
|  14.2%
|   Lost
|-
|- 
|Sharon Begosh, Republican
|15.096
|  13.9%
|   Lost
|-
|- 
|Michael Ostroff, Republican
|15,086
|  13.9%
|   Lost
|}

2010 race for the Maryland House of Delegates – 14th district
Voters to choose three:
{| class="wikitable"
|-
!Name
!Votes
!Percent
!Outcome
|-
|- 
|Anne Kaiser, Democratic
|23,503
|  21.5%
|   Won
|-
|- 
|Craig Zucker, Democratic
|22,148
|  20.2%
|   Won
|-
|- 
|Eric Luedtke, Democratic
|21,165
|  19.3%
|   Won
|-
|- 
|Patricia Fenati, Republican
|14,866
|  13.6%
|   Lost
|-
|- 
|Henry Kahwaty, Republican
|14,152
|  12.9%
|   Lost
|-
|- 
|Maria Peña-Faustino, Republican
|13,639
|  12.5%
|   Lost
|}

2006 race for the Maryland House of Delegates – 14th district
Voters to choose three:
{| class="wikitable"
|-
!Name
!Votes
!Percent
!Outcome
|-
|- 
|Anne Kaiser, Democratic
|24,500
|  21.8%
|   Won
|-
|- 
|Karen S. Montgomery, Democratic
|24,478 
|  21.8%
|   Won
|-
|- 
|Herman L. Taylor, Jr., Democratic
|24,273
|  21.6%
|   Won
|-
|- 
|John McKinnis, Republican
|13,471 
|  12.0%
|   Lost
|-
|- 
|John Austin, Republican
|12,963
|  11.5%
|   Lost
|-
|- 
|Jim Goldberg, Republican
|12,603
|  11.2%
|   Lost
|-
|- 
|other write-ins
|61
|  0.1%
|   Lost
|-
|}

Legislative notes
 voted for the Healthy Air Act in 2006 (SB154)
 voted against slots in 2005 (HB1361)
 voted in favor of increasing the sales tax whilst simultaneously reducing income tax rates for some income brackets – Tax Reform Act of 2007(HB2)
 voted in favor of in-state tuition for illegal immigrants in 2007

References

External links 
Legislative homepage
Campaign website

Democratic Party members of the Maryland House of Delegates
Living people
1968 births
LGBT state legislators in Maryland
Lesbian politicians

University of Chicago alumni
Gerald R. Ford School of Public Policy alumni
Women state legislators in Maryland
People from Rockville, Maryland
People from Silver Spring, Maryland
21st-century American politicians
21st-century American women politicians
University of Michigan alumni
21st-century LGBT people